Liptena lualaba is a butterfly in the family Lycaenidae. It is found in the Democratic Republic of the Congo (Lualaba and Uele) and Zambia.

References

Butterflies described in 1981
Liptena